Gerald Lynn Geison (March 26, 1943 – July 3, 2001) was an American historian who died at 58.

Career
Gerald L. Geison went on to earn a doctorate in Yale University's Department of the History of Science and Medicine in 1970 and then joined the Princeton faculty, where he was a professor in the history department and the Program in History of Science.

"He wrote two books, The Private Science of Louis Pasteur (1995) and Michael Foster and the Cambridge School of Physiology: The Scientific Enterprise in Late Victorian Society (1978), and edited four more. In addition, he wrote about 40 scholarly essays and book reviews and contributed 20 articles to the Dictionary of Scientific Biography.

At Princeton, Geison served as director of the Program in History of Science from 1980 to 1986 and was the program's director of graduate studies for many years. He was associate dean of the college from 1977 to 1979, master of the Graduate College from 1982 to 1985, and secretary of the Committee on the Course of Study from 1977 to 1979.

He received many honors and invitations to lecture on his work. The American Association for the History of Medicine awarded its 1996 William H. Welch Medal to Geison's book on Pasteur. He was a visiting scholar at the Institute for Advanced Study, a visiting historical scholar at the National Library of Medicine and a visiting senior Wellcome fellow at the Wellcome Institute for the History of Medicine in London. He received a Howard Foundation fellowship in 1979-80.

Early in his academic career, Geison was a postdoctoral fellow at the Institute of the History of Medicine at Johns Hopkins University and a research fellow at the University of Minnesota Medical School.

Geison was a member of the editorial board of the Journal of the History of Medicine (1996), a contributing editor of Osiris (1984–1991), and advisory editor of Isis (1979–82). He was a member of the History of Science Society and served on several society committees. He also served as a referee and consultant for the National Endowment for the Humanities, the National Institutes of Health, the National Science Foundation, the American Physiological Society, and the university presses of California, Cambridge, Harvard, Notre Dame, Oxford and Princeton."

Opinions on his work
 "His biography of Pasteur was viewed as an outstanding work of scholarship which penetrated the secrecy that had surrounded much of the legendary scientist's laboratory work. Geison used Pasteur's laboratory notebooks and published papers to described some of the most famous episodes in the history of science—including their darker sides, such as the human risks entailed in Pasteur's haste to develop the rabies vaccine. A reviewer wrote in the New England Journal of Medicine that the book 'requires us to reevaluate our heroes and consider the complexities of science instead of merely clinging to comforting and heroic myths.' "
 "A quite different (from Bruno Latour's) approach to Pasteur has recently been taken by Gerald L. Geison in The Private Science of Louis Pasteur. Geison utilizes the French national hero’s private laboratory notebooks to reveal striking discrepancies between them and his public pronouncements. Although Geison’s aim is not to detract from Pasteur’s greatness as a scientist, but rather to present a “Pasteur for our times,” his book has been criticized by scientists who apparently feel that any de-hagiographication of this towering figure amounts to an attack on science as such"
 "the finally published book of the only historian really specialized in the history of Pasteur."
 Max Perutz came to a very unfavorable conclusion about Geison's life of Pasteur: "Toppling great men from their pedestals, sometimes on the slenderest of evidence, has become a fashionable and lucrative industry, and a safe one, since they cannot sue because they are dead. Geison is in good company, but he, rather than Pasteur, seems to me guilty of unethical and unsavory conduct when he burrows through Pasteur’s notebooks for scraps of supposed wrongdoing and then inflates these out of all proportion, in order to drag Pasteur down. In fact, his evidence is contrived, and does not survive scientific examination."  New York Review of Books, December 21, 1995
 In a 1999 article and a 2003 book, D. Raynaud concludes that the apology for Félix Pouchet presented by John Farley and Geison in their 1974 article on the controversy between Pouchet and Pasteur is futile. 
 In a work published in 2019, Joseph Gal, of the University of Colorado Denver, concludes that Geison's criticisms of Pasteur's work on the chirality of molecules are "entirely without scientific basis".

References

1943 births
2001 deaths
Institute for Advanced Study visiting scholars
Historians from Illinois
People from Savanna, Illinois